Godfrey Elton, 1st Baron Elton (29 March 1892 – 18 April 1973), was a British historian.

Early life
Elton was the eldest son of Edward Fiennes Elton and his wife Violet Hylda Fletcher. He was educated at Rugby and Balliol College, Oxford. At Oxford he at first studied classics, gaining a First in Classical Moderations in 1913, but later turned to history. However, he never took his history finals as, following the outbreak of World War I, in August 1914, he was commissioned into the 4th Battalion of the Hampshire Regiment (later the Royal Hampshire Regiment) in September 1914. He fought in the Mesopotamian campaign and was wounded during the siege of Kut-el-Amara. After Kut fell in April 1916 he was taken prisoner by the Turks. After the war Elton was elected a Fellow of Queen's College, Oxford, in 1919, and was lecturer in modern history from 1919 to 1939, dean of the college between 1921 and 1923 and tutor from 1927 to 1934. In 1923 he published The Revolutionary Idea in France, 1789–1878.

Political career
Elton was also involved in politics. He joined the Labour Party shortly after the end of World War I and stood unsuccessfully for Thornbury in the 1924 and 1929 general elections. He was a strong supporter of Ramsay MacDonald, whose son Malcolm MacDonald had been his pupil at Oxford, and followed him into National Labour. On 16 January 1934, on MacDonald's initiative, he was raised to the peerage as Baron Elton, of Headington in the County of Oxford. Elton's somewhat controversial elevation to the peerage caused fellow historian Lewis Namier to remark: "In the eighteenth-century peers made their tutors under-secretaries; in the twentieth under-secretaries make their tutors peers" (Malcolm MacDonald was at the time serving as Under-Secretary of State for Dominion Affairs). Lord Elton was a frequent speaker in the House of Lords and a member of several government committees.

Rhodes Trust
In 1939 Elton gave up his teaching fellowship at Queen's College and the same year he became secretary of the Rhodes Trust, a post he held until 1959.

Author
Elton was the author of several books, notably a biography of Ramsay MacDonald, entitled The Life of James Ramsay MacDonald 1866–1919. In 1938 he published his autobiography, Among Others.

Elton's writings were cited by George Orwell in his famous essay Notes on Nationalism as a prime example of what Orwell characterised as 'Neo-Toryism'.

Personal life
Lord Elton married Dedi, daughter of Gustav Hartmann of Oslo, Norway, in 1921. They had three children, one son and two daughters:

 Hon Audrey Elton (born 22 June 1922)
 Hon Rosemary Elton (22 January 1925 – 2 June 2017)
 Rodney Elton, 2nd Baron Elton (born 2 March 1930)

Lord Elton died at the Dower House in Sutton Bonington, Nottinghamshire on 18 April 1973 aged 81.  His son Rodney succeeded him in the peerage and became a Conservative government minister. Lady Elton died in 1977.

Coat of arms

Notes

References 
 Blake, Lord; Nicholls, C. S. (editors) The Dictionary of National Biography, 1971–1980 Oxford University Press, 1986
 Kidd, Charles, Williamson, David (editors) Debrett's Peerage and Baronetage (1990 edition) New York: St Martin's Press, 1990, 
 

1892 births
1973 deaths
Military personnel from Oxfordshire
British World War I prisoners of war
Barons in the Peerage of the United Kingdom
Royal Hampshire Regiment officers
People educated at Rugby School
Alumni of Balliol College, Oxford
World War I prisoners of war held by the Ottoman Empire
British Army personnel of World War I
Fellows of The Queen's College, Oxford
British biographers
National Labour (UK) politicians
Barons created by George V